Invierno may refer to:

The Winter, a 2016 Argentine film
Mina Invierno, a coal mine in Riesco Island, Chile
"El Invierno", a tapestry cartoon by Francisco Goya, 
"Invierno", a short story in Junot Díaz' 2012 collection This Is How You Lose Her

Songs
"Invierno", on the album Secuencia, Reik, 2006
"Invierno", on the album Las 4 Estaciones del Amor, Natalia Lafourcade, 2007
"Invierno", on the album Los Claxons, Los Claxons, 2010
"Invierno", on the album Revoltosa, Bongo Botrako, 2012

See also

Winter